4-Benzylpiperidine is a drug and research chemical used in scientific studies. It acts as a monoamine releasing agent with 20- to 48-fold selectivity for releasing dopamine versus serotonin. It is most efficacious as a releaser of norepinephrine, with an ec50 of 109/41.4/5246nM for DA/NE/5HT, respectively . It has a fast onset of action and a short duration. It also functions as a monoamine oxidase inhibitor (MAOI) with preference for MAO-A.

Synthesis
4-Cyanopyridine can be reacted with toluene to give 4-benzylpyridine. Catalytic hydrogenation of the pyridine ring then completes the synthesis.

See also 
 2-Benzylpiperidine
 Benzylpiperazine
Tetrahydroisoquinoline

References 

Stimulants
4-Piperidinyl compounds
Designer drugs
Norepinephrine-dopamine releasing agents